This article presents a list of Cantons in the Ain department of France. Consisting of 49 cantons after the creation of the department structure in 1790, the number was reduced to 32 during the overhaul of the cantonal map in 1801, before increasing over time to 43 due to demographic changes. The cantonal realignment of 2014, applicable from the March 2015 departmental elections, reduced the number of cantons to 23.

Cantonal realignment of 2014

Detailed composition

References